A Touch of Class (often shortened in initials as ATC) were an international Eurodance group based in Germany, although the four members each came from different countries—Joseph "Joey" Murray (born 5 July 1974) from New Zealand, Sarah Egglestone (b. 4 April 1975) from Australia, Livio Salvi (b. 25 January 1977) from Italy, and Tracey Elizabeth Packham (b. 30 July 1977) from the United Kingdom. The pop group was active from 1999 to 2003 and their most successful release was "Around the World (La La La La La)", released in 2000, which was an English cover of the song "Pesenka" by the Russian group Ruki Vverh!. The group disbanded in 2004.

Career
The four met together in Hamburg, Germany as cast members of the international Broadway theatre German production of the stage musical Cats from October 1997 to April 1998. Sarah Egglestone played Bombalurina, Livio Salvi played Mungojerrie, Tracey Packham played Syllabub, and Joey Murray played as Munkustrap/swing dancer. The four quickly became friends and decided to form a dance group. Egglestone noted, "We were there sitting watching television one day, seeing groups and saying 'there's no reason [...] why we can't do this.'" The group first met with producers Alex Christensen and Thomas M. Stein in 1999 and began working on material under the name ATC. The group experimented with merging male and female vocals together. "Producers don't seem to want to mix the voices so often [...] that helps give us that little bit of an edge," Murray remarked.

Their first single, "Around the World (La La La La La)" (which was an English cover of the song "Pesenka" by the Russian group Ruki Vverh!) was first released on 1 April 2000 and went number one in Germany for six weeks in summer 2000. It was later an only Top 40 hit in the United Kingdom and United States.

Their debut album Planet Pop, featuring songs from Alex Christensen and Clyde Ward, was released on 6 February 2001 by Sony BMG Music Entertainment and Republic Records, for which they were awarded an ECHO for Best Dance Act.

In 2001, the group released the single I'm In Heaven (When You Kiss Me), which was moderately successful in parts of Europe. In 2002, "Set Me Free" was released as a single but was not successful. In 2003, the DJ and producer ATB successfully took the band's record label to court, and the band was forced to formally drop the ATC initials. Following the name change, the group released a final single, "New York City", and their second album, Touch the Sky in 2003, but they did not match the success of their previous records. In 2004, the group disbanded as the members decided to go their separate ways.

Discography

Albums

Singles

References

External links
ATC @ Bubblegum Dancer

1999 establishments in Germany
2003 disestablishments in Germany
Europop groups
Eurodance groups
Musical groups established in 1999
Musical groups disestablished in 2003
Musical groups from Hamburg
Sony BMG artists